Rustem Mukhametovich Garifullin (Рустем Мухаметович Гарифуллин) (born 3 March 1967 in Kazan) is a Russian rugby league footballer. He currently plays for a senior team called "Sedye Barsy" and is currently the acting vice-president of Energya, a rugby club from Kazan.

who represented Russia in the 2000 World Cup.

Playing career
Known for his performances for Strela Kazan, a many-times champion and winner of the Russian Cup [5]. Garifullin was selected for the Russian squad at the 2000 World Cup in the United Kingdom. He played in one match, starting at second row in Russia's 4-110 loss to Australia.

His son, Islam Garifullin, is a professional rugby player from the Energya team, previously he played for the KSPEU; Garifullin is also a licensed rugby referee.

References

Living people
1967 births
Sportspeople from Kazan
Russian rugby league players
Russia national rugby league team players
Rugby league second-rows